Žitovlice is a municipality and village in Nymburk District in the Central Bohemian Region of the Czech Republic. It has about 200 inhabitants.

Administrative parts
The village of Pojedy is an administrative part of Žitovlice.

References

Villages in Nymburk District